This is a list of mines in Nunavut, Canada. It includes mines that were operating prior to 1999 in what was then Northwest Territories. Start and end dates set in the future are projected, or "expected".

References

External links
The Atlas of Canada - Minerals and Mining

Nunavut